Cherokee Removal Memorial Park is a public park in Meigs County, Tennessee that is dedicated in memory of the Cherokee who were forced to emigrate from their ancestral lands during the Cherokee removal, in an event that came to be known as the Trail of Tears. It was established in 2005, and has since expanded.

Background
Cherokee Removal Memorial Park is located on the banks of the Tennessee River near Blythe Ferry, which was used to transport many of the Cherokees west on their journey to Indian Territory in present-day Oklahoma. The removal was headquartered at Fort Cass in nearby Charleston.

Description and history

The park is a partnership between the government of Meigs County, Tennessee Valley Authority (TVA), Tennessee Wildlife Resources Agency (TWRA), National Park Service (NPS), and Friends of the Cherokee. It is surrounded by Hiwassee Wildlife Refuge, which is managed by the TWRA. The park is located on 29 acres consists of a visitor center containing an interpretive center, library, and presentation room, history wall which chronicles the development of the Cherokee people, memorial wall which identifies the names of Cherokee who were removed, and map of the Trail of Tears carved in stone on the ground. It is listed as an interpretive center on the Trail of Tears National Historic Trail.

The park was established in 2005, with the visitor center opening in May 2009. The memorial wall was dedicated on October 27, 2013.

See also
Fort Cass
Red Clay State Park
Hiwassee River Heritage Center

References

2005 establishments in Tennessee
Museums established in 2009
Native American museums in Tennessee
Tourist attractions in Meigs County, Tennessee
Buildings and structures in Meigs County, Tennessee
Museums in Meigs County, Tennessee
19th century Cherokee history
Trail of Tears
Cherokee Nation (1794–1907)
Protected areas established in 2005
2009 establishments in Tennessee